Andy Roddick was the defending champion and won in the final 7–6(7–4), 6–4 against Sébastien Grosjean.

Seeds
The top eight seeds received a bye to the second round.

  Andy Roddick (champion)
  Guillermo Coria (second round)
  Andre Agassi (second round)
  Tim Henman (second round)
  Sébastien Grosjean (final)
  Lleyton Hewitt (semifinals)
  Paradorn Srichaphan (quarterfinals)
  Sjeng Schalken (third round)
  Mark Philippoussis (first round)
  Max Mirnyi (first round)
  Taylor Dent (first round)
  Robby Ginepri (second round)
  David Ferrer (first round)
  Ivo Karlović (third round)
  Radek Štěpánek (quarterfinals)
  Todd Martin (second round)

Draw

Finals

Top half

Section 1

Section 2

Bottom half

Section 3

Section 4

External links 
 2004 Stella Artois Championships draw

Singles